The 1980–81 Czechoslovak Extraliga season was the 38th season of the Czechoslovak Extraliga, the top level of ice hockey in Czechoslovakia. 12 teams participated in the league, and TJ Vitkovice won the championship.

Regular season

1. Liga-Qualification 
 Zetor Brno – PS Poprad 3:2 (3:1, 2:3, 3:4, 5:2, 4:3)

External links
History of Czechoslovak ice hockey

Czechoslovak Extraliga seasons
Czech
1980–81 in Czechoslovak ice hockey